2004 Kyoto Purple Sanga season

Competitions

Domestic results

J. League 2

Emperor's Cup

Player statistics

Other pages
 J. League official site

Kyoto Purple Sanga
Kyoto Sanga FC seasons